Davis Saddle is an ice saddle just eastward of Mitchell Peak on Guest Peninsula, along the coast of Marie Byrd Land. It was mapped by the United States Geological Survey from surveys and U.S. Navy air photos, 1959–65, and was named by the Advisory Committee on Antarctic Names for Clinton S. Davis, U.S. Navy, Boatswain's Mate aboard USS Glacier along this coast, 1961–62.

References
 

Mountain passes of Antarctica
Landforms of Marie Byrd Land